Boss Tenor is an album by saxophonist Gene Ammons recorded in 1960 and released on the Prestige label.

Reception
The Allmusic review by Scott Yanow stated: "Unlike his earlier jam sessions, this particular outing finds Ammons as the only horn, fronting a talented rhythm section... This is a fine outing by one of the true "bosses" of the tenor".

Track listing 
All compositions by Gene Ammons, except where indicated.
 "Hittin' the Jug" – 8:29    
 "Close Your Eyes" (Bernice Petkere) – 3:46    
 "My Romance" (Lorenz Hart, Richard Rodgers) – 4:16    
 "Canadian Sunset" (Norman Gimbel, Eddie Heywood) – 5:24    
 "Blue Ammons" – 4:57    
 "Confirmation" (Charlie Parker) – 5:24    
 "Stompin' at the Savoy" (Benny Goodman, Arthur Sampson, Chick Webb, Andy Razaf) – 3:31

Personnel 
Gene Ammons – tenor saxophone
Tommy Flanagan – piano
Doug Watkins – bass
Art Taylor – drums
Ray Barretto – congas

References 

Gene Ammons albums
1960 albums
Prestige Records albums
Albums recorded at Van Gelder Studio
Albums produced by Bob Weinstock